FIVB Volleyball Club World Championship may refer to:

 FIVB Volleyball Men's Club World Championship
 FIVB Volleyball Women's Club World Championship